NASCAR 2001 is a racing simulator video game developed and published by EA Sports. The game was released on October 30, 2000 for the Sony PlayStation, and became the first from EA Sports NASCAR series to be released for the Sony PlayStation 2 on November 6. NASCAR 2001 was the fourth game in the EA Sports NASCAR series, and is the first in the series to include manufacturer representation (although the Windows version of NASCAR 2000 and NASCAR Arcade, released by Sega under EA Sports' license, also featured manufacturer branding) and Daytona International Speedway.

The game features tributes to Adam Petty and Kenny Irwin Jr. (who otherwise are also playable drivers), who died during the season the game was based.

Reception
David Chen reviewed the PlayStation 2 version of the game for Next Generation, rating it two stars out of five, and stated that "ultimately as enjoyable as driving in circles, NASCAR 2001 is neither pretty nor fun".

Reviews
Absolute Playstation (Nov, 2000)
The Adrenaline Vault (Dec 19, 2000)
Game Informer Magazine (Dec, 2000)
IGN (Oct 12, 2000)
GameZone (Mar 02, 2001)
GameSpot (Sep 28, 2000)
Game Vortex (Dec 07, 2002)
IGN (Nov 07, 2000)
Gamer's Pulse (Dec 27, 2000)
GameSpot (Nov 17, 2000)
PlanetPS2 (Jan 15, 2001)

References

External links

2000 video games
EA Sports games
Electronic Arts games
NASCAR video games
North America-exclusive video games
PlayStation (console) games
PlayStation 2 games
Simulation video games
Video games developed in Canada
Video games developed in the United States